Jesse Gibbon (born January 14, 1997) is a professional Canadian football offensive lineman for the Montreal Alouettes of the Canadian Football League (CFL).

University career
Gibbon played U Sports football for the Waterloo Warriors, where he appeared in 32 regular season games at left tackle over the course of four seasons.

Professional career

Hamilton Tiger-Cats
Gibbon was selected second overall in the 2019 CFL Draft by the Hamilton Tiger-Cats. He also participated in a mini camp with the Pittsburgh Steelers of the National Football League. He played in 42 regular season games over three seasons for the Tiger-Cats as well as two Grey Cup games.

Edmonton Elks
On September 2, 2022, Gibbon was traded to the Edmonton Elks for David Beard and an exchange of 2023 CFL Draft picks.

Montreal Alouettes
On February 15, 2023, it was announced that Gibbon had been traded to the Montreal Alouettes for a second-round pick in the 2024 CFL Draft.

References

External links
Montreal Alouettes bio

1997 births
Living people
Canadian football offensive linemen
Edmonton Elks players
Hamilton Tiger-Cats players
Montreal Alouettes players
Players of Canadian football from Ontario
Sportspeople from Hamilton, Ontario
Waterloo Warriors football players